Lamprococcus is a subgenus of the genus Aechmea.

Species
Species accepted by Encyclopedia of Bromeliads as of October 2022:

Aechmea andersonii 
Aechmea brevicollis 
Aechmea campanulata 
Aechmea capixabae 
Aechmea carvalhoi 
Aechmea corymbosa 
Aechmea farinosa 
Aechmea fulgens 
Aechmea glandulosa 
Aechmea miniata 
Aechmea pedicellata 
Aechmea podantha 
Aechmea racinae 
Aechmea victoriana 
Aechmea warasii 
Aechmea weilbachii

References

Plant subgenera